Paul Gerald Riblett (May 23, 1908 – March 1, 1976) was an American football player and coach.  He played professionally as an end for five seasons in the National Football League (NFL) with the Brooklyn Dodgers.  Riblett attended the University of Pennsylvania, where he starred in  football, basketball, and lacrosse.  He was the captain of the 1931 Penn Quakers football team.  Riblett worked as an ends coach at the City College of New York (CCNY) under Benny Friedman before returning to his alma mater in 1938 as an assistant football coach under George Munger.

References

1908 births
1976 deaths
American football ends
Brooklyn Dodgers (NFL) players
CCNY Beavers football coaches
Penn Quakers football coaches
Penn Quakers football players
Penn Quakers men's basketball players
Penn Quakers men's lacrosse players
People from Westmoreland County, Pennsylvania
Players of American football from Pennsylvania
American men's basketball players